Alter Date is a 2019 Nigerian romantic comedy movie produced by Marc Adebesin and directed by Yemi Banjoko.  

The movie that discuss the women's ordeal about men stars Iyabo Ojo, Bolanle Ninalowo and Kenneth Okolie

Synopsis 
The movie revolves around three friends who are looking for love. The first one needs a rich man to maintain her standard, the second one is not lucky with men and the last one is romantically helpless and she always falls in love with the wrong men.

Premiere 
The movie was screened on Wednesday, April 17, 2019, at Silverbird Cinema, Ikeja City Mall, Lagos recently.

Awards and nominations 
The movie won seven awards and received 25 nominations excluding  an award from GAP Awarding Body for contributing to the images of Africa.

Cast 

 Iyabo Ojo
 Bolanle Ninalowo
 Kenneth Okolie
 Frederick Leonard
 Joseph Momodu
 Yemisi Banjoko

References 

2019 films
Nigerian romantic comedy films
English-language Nigerian films